Labeobarbus versluysii is a species of cyprinid fish endemic to Cameroon in the Wouri, Sanaga and Nyong river basins.

References 

Cyprinid fish of Africa
Endemic fauna of Cameroon
versluysii
Fish described in 1929